The .280 Remington, also known as the 7mm-06 Remington and  7mm Express Remington, was introduced in 1957 for the Remington model 740, 760, 721, and 725 rifles.

History
Having been released 32 years after the .270 Winchester, it had somewhat unspectacular sales. Remington renamed the cartridge in late 1978 to 7mm-06 Remington. but just before the end of the year, they renamed it again, calling it the 7 mm Express in an attempt to increase sales.  This resulted in people confusing it with the 7 mm Remington Magnum, and Remington changed the name back to .280 in 1981.

Specifications

The .280 is based on the .30-06 necked down to accept 7 mm (.284 in) bullets, with the neck moved forward .050 in (1.27mm). The neck was deliberately moved forward to prevent chambering in a .270 Winchester rifle, as firing a .280 round in a .270 rifle could cause the projectile to get stuck in the barrel or rupture the barrel due to excessive pressure.

.280 Remington vs .270 Winchester

The .280 Remington is capable of generating slightly higher velocities in heavier bullet weights (150 grains and above) than the .270 Winchester due to a marginally greater case capacity. However, the ballistic coefficient of equal-weight bullets favors .270 caliber bullets over 7mm (.284) bullets of similar design. In the heavier bullets (150 grains and above) of similar design, the .280 Remington has a slight edge in muzzle energy. 

With equal-weight bullets of similar design, the .270 Winchester surpasses the .280 Remington's long-range velocity and energy due to the 270's higher ballistic coefficient according to Federal's ammunition catalog. There are also many more factory loads available for the .270 Winchester over the .280 Remington at a lower price point due to the .270's much greater popularity.

Renowned for being a strong advocate of the .270 Winchester, gun writer Jack O'Connor's last rifle was a Ruger M77 restocked by Alvin Biesen but this time chambered in .280 Remington, which tells about the high regards O'Connor had on the cartridge.

.280 vs .30-06
The .280 Remington is capable of developing energy nearly equal to the .30-06 Springfield, but with lighter bullets having a better ballistic coefficient.  The .30-06 produces more energy than the .280 with bullets heavier than 180 grains, though .284" 175-grain bullets have a high sectional density of .310, compared to the 30-06 180-grain bullet with a moderate sectional density of .271. The .280 is suitable for hunting any game in North America with good shot placement.

SAAMI pressure limit for the .280 Remington is set at 60,000 PSI, 50,000 CUP.

Most American rifle and ammunition manufacturers catalogue the .280 Remington. 

The .30-06 is substantially more popular and manufacturers thus offer a much greater selection of loads at a substantially lower price point.

However, "The slight difference in length of reformed cases doesn't make any practical difference."

.280 Remington vs 7x64 Brenneke

In Europe the .280 Remington is not popular in bolt-action rifles since it competes directly with the 7×64mm, which is of the almost exact same size as the .280 Remington but has slightly more power,  because of having a slightly higher maximum allowed chamber pressure and a slightly higher case capacity. The twist rate for the 7x64 is 1 in 8.66 inch against 1 in 10 inch for the 280 Remington. Nearly every European rifle producer offers the 7x64 as a standard caliber.

The .280 Remington does, however, have a larger than expected number of European users in imported self-loading rifles such as those by Remington.

.280 Ackley Improved

One of P.O. Ackley's earliest wildcats was the 7mm-06 Improved, which was made by necking down the .30-06
Springfield case and fire-forming it to have less body taper and a 40-degree shoulder angle. Soon after the .280 Remington came out, Fred Huntington reformed its case to an improved configuration with minimum body taper, a 35-degree shoulder angle, and called it the .280 RCBS. Since cases for the .280 RCBS could be formed by firing .280 Remington ammo in a rifle chambered for the former, Ackley abandoned the 7mm-06 Improved and started chambering rifles for the .280 RCBS. He then changed the 35-degree shoulder to 40-degrees and the .280 Ackley Improved was born. If barrel length and chamber pressure are equal, the .280 Ackley Improved is about 100 fps faster with all bullet weights than the standard .280 Remington. In 2007, ammunition manufacturer Nosler registered the .280 Ackley Improved with SAAMI and began providing factory loaded ammunition and rifles for it.

See also
 7mm Weatherby Magnum
 7mm-08 Remington
 7×57mm Mauser
 7mm Remington Magnum
 7×64mm
 7 mm caliber
 List of rifle cartridges
 Table of handgun and rifle cartridges
 Delta L problem
 Sectional density
 Ballistic coefficient
7mm-06
.280 British

References

Pistol and rifle cartridges
Remington Arms cartridges